Wushu was contested by both men and women at the 1997 East Asian Games.

Medalists

Men

Women

Medal table

References 

Wushu at the East Asian Games
1997 East Asian Games
1997 in wushu (sport)